Grover Cleveland Dillman (July 18, 1889 – April 14, 1979) was an American engineer and politician who was the President of the Michigan College of Mining and Technology (now known as the Michigan Technological University) from 1933 to 1956. Dillman held several positions in the Michigan state government over a 20-year career as an engineer for the State Highway Department, most notably as the elected state highway commissioner from 1929 to 1933.

Early life and education
Dillman was born on July 18, 1889 in Bangor, Michigan. His father, Henry Dillman, was a prominent figure in local Democratic Party politics, serving as a councilman and village president. His grandfather, Johann Adam Dillman, was born in Hessen, Germany, and immigrated to the United States in 1831.

Dillman attended elementary schools in rural parts of Van Buren County, and graduated from Bangor High School in 1909, He attended the Michigan Agricultural College, receiving a Bachelor of Science in civil engineering in 1913.

Michigan State Highway Department
Shortly after graduating from the Michigan Agricultural College in 1913, Dillman became an engineer for the Michigan State Highway Department, working in the Upper Peninsula. He quickly rose through the ranks, becoming a state maintenance engineer in 1920, and the deputy state highway commissioner in 1922, a position he held until 1929.

State Highway Commissioner
In 1929, Dillman was elected Michigan state highway commissioner as a member of the Republican Party. His time in office was marked by the Great Depression, which left millions of Americans without work. Dillman established a program which put an estimated 100,000 people to work on highways, reducing unemployment in the state by approximately 6%. Dillman did not run for re-election in 1933, and left office on June 30 of that year.

Later career
On July 1, 1933, the day after he left office as state highway commissioner, Dillman was appointed as the director of public service for the City of Grand Rapids. He held that position until 1935, when he was appointed by Governor Frank Fitzgerald as the director of the State Welfare Department. Dillman held the office for only eight months, as he resigned to assume the presidency of the Michigan College of Mining and Technology.

President of the Michigan College of Mining and Technology
Dillman took office as president of the Michigan College of Mining and Technology on August 15, 1935, succeeding William O. Hotchkiss. His presidency saw significant changes in the college, most notably the creation of a branch campus in Sault Ste. Marie. Under Dillman's leadership, the college procured the village of Alberta, establishing the Ford Forestry Center and Research Forest in 1954.

In 1952, the Memorial Union Building was established, which sits at the centre of the university's main campus. It has since been remodeled, and now hosts a cafeteria; billiards, meeting rooms; student organization offices; and lounges. The college's enrollment significantly increased following World War II, with temporary housing being established due to the influx of veterans. Several programs were added during Dillman's presidency, including engineering administration; physics; and geological engineering. He retired as president of the college in 1956.

Personal life and death
Dillman married Anna Broadwell on December 15, 1914, with whom he had two children, Dorothy and Helen. His wife died in 1969 in St. Petersburg, Florida. Dillman died in Flint, Michigan, on April 14, 1979 at the age of 89.

Legacy and honours
The Grover C. Dillman Hall in the Michigan Technological University is named after him, as is the Dr. Grover C. Dillman Memorial Scholarship Fund.

Honorary degrees
Doctor of Engineering from the Michigan Technological University in Houghton, Michigan
Master of Highway Engineering from the Michigan State University in East Lansing, Michigan

References

1889 births
1979 deaths
Michigan politicians
People from Bangor, Michigan
Michigan Republicans
People from Van Buren County, Michigan
20th-century American politicians
American engineers
Presidents of Michigan Technological University
American people of German descent